Seamus Haji (born 30 December 1968) is an English DJ and record producer.

Biography 
Seamus Haji had a number one on the UK Dance Chart, with a cover of Indeep's, "Last Night a DJ Saved My Life". He originally released this as a single in 2004. The single originally reached #69 on the UK Singles Chart, and #13 on re-issue in March 2007 and #1 on the UK Dance Chart.

He is of Irish and Indian descent. He has remixed many tracks by other artists, some of which have been promoted as the main version of the track in question. "Boogie 2nite" by Booty Luv, which reached number 2 on the UK chart, being one such track. Haji has worked with many of the biggest names in music, including Mariah Carey, Rihanna, Moby, Mika and most recently, Jamiroquai and Estelle.

He often produces in partnership with Paul Emanuel (formerly of Club Asylum), and together they had a UK Singles Chart hit in 2005, with their cover of True Faith and Bridgette Grace with Final Cut's, "Take Me Away".

In 2010, he released a track called "Good Times", in collaboration with Mark Knight and Funkagenda. In 2018, he made two tracks with Sammy Deuce called "Disco Crown" and "Celebrate Disco". In 2018, he released another single called "Give Your Love".

Discography

References

External links

Seamus Haji discography on Beatport

Living people
English DJs
English record producers
English house musicians
House DJs
Club DJs
Remixers
1968 births
Electronic dance music DJs